Soumitra ‘Sunny’ Saha (born August 1972) has been Senior Vice President and Managing Director of Turner Broadcasting System’s (part of Time Warner) Southeast Asia Pacific business, and the General Manager of its Kids networks in Asia Pacific.

Career history

Summary
Since joining Turner Broadcasting in September 2000, Saha led, in turn, advertising sales and research for India & South Asia; the Asia Pacific regional advertising sales, promotional licensing, marketing, interactive and research teams; all kids and general entertainment networks across Asia Pacific; and most recently the company’s business for Southeast Asia Pacific. He had strategic oversight of Turner’s kids business across the Asia Pacific region. He launched several TV channels, built five kids brands in the Asia Pacific region, and expanded Turner’s portfolio by developing general entertainment brands in India, Japan, Korea and Southeast Asia.

Early years 
Saha began his career at Indian Market Research Bureau as a Research Executive in 1995. He was part of the team that launched TAM Media Research in India, one of the most comprehensive TV audience measurement services in the world. During his tenure, Saha trained professionals of the Indian media industry (broadcasters, advertisers, media agencies and analysts) on audience analytics and planning.

References

External links 
 Turner set to launch new English movie channel in Aug http://articles.economictimes.indiatimes.com/2008-07-07/news/27729646_1_english-movie-channel-turner-international-revenue-kitty 
 World's first Cartoon Network water park to open in Thailand http://travel.cnn.com/bangkok/visit/pull-out-your-powerpuff-bikini-cartoon-network-building-waterpark-614670 
 Pester power draws new ads to Cartoon Network http://www.thehindubusinessline.in/2002/06/14/stories/2002061400380600.htm 
 Cartoon Network vies for adult eyeballs http://articles.economictimes.indiatimes.com/2002-07-02/news/27359521_1_new-advertisers-advertising-sales-revenue
‘Animation could be the next general entertainment’ http://www.dnaindia.com/money/report-animation-could-be-the-next-general-entertainment-1174876
 Marketers bow to mighty kid power http://articles.timesofindia.indiatimes.com/2002-02-02/bangalore/27115507_1_cartoon-network-music-systems-brands
 HLL relaunches kids ice-cream portfolio – Ties up with Cartoon Network for promos http://www.thehindubusinessline.in/2003/03/21/stories/2003032101620200.htm
 Prudential launches Cha-Ching Money-Smart Kids - a first in Asia http://www.prudentialcorporation-asia.com/corp/prudential_en_pca/header/press/mediainvestors/pressreleases/2011/20110906_01_Regional.html

Living people
Indian television executives
Turner Broadcasting System people
1972 births
Warner Bros. Discovery Asia-Pacific